Henri Barthélemy Marius Perrissol (16 December 1909 – 4 April 1964) was a French sailor. He competed in the Swallow event at the 1948 Summer Olympics.

References

External links
 

1909 births
1964 deaths
French male sailors (sport)
Olympic sailors of France
Sailors at the 1948 Summer Olympics – Swallow